Igor Porobić (born April 21, 1993) is a Montenegrin water polo player.

References

External links 
Igor Porobić on Instagram

Living people
1993 births